was a weekly language newspaper published between 1969 and 1999 in Pristina, Kosovo. It was one of the Turkish-language publications started in Yugoslavia.

History and profile
The first issue of Tan appeared on 1 May 1969. The paper was started by the League of Communists of Kosovo. It was published by Tan Printing Company. It was first published on a biweekly basis, but later the frequency was switched to weekly. The goal of the newspaper was to transmit cultural identity of the Turkish-origin people in the region to next generations. Şükrü Zeynullah worked for the paper from 1975 to 1981 as a trade director.

Tan published several supplements and books. It frequently featured literary work by Turkish-origin authors. The paper ceased publication in 1999.

References

1969 establishments in Yugoslavia
1999 disestablishments in Kosovo
Defunct weekly newspapers
Mass media in Pristina
Newspapers published in Kosovo
Newspapers published in Yugoslavia
Publications established in 1969
Publications disestablished in 1999
Turkish-language newspapers
Communist newspapers
Eastern Bloc mass media
Biweekly newspapers